The Shaper of Worlds is a fictional character appearing in American comic books published by Marvel Comics.

Publication history

The Shaper of Worlds was created by Archie Goodwin and Herb Trimpe, and first appeared in Incredible Hulk #155 (Sep 1972). Its origin was first revealed in Captain America Annual #7 (1983).

Fictional character biography
The Shaper of Worlds' existence began thousands of years ago as a Cosmic Cube created by Skrull scientists on an unnamed planet in the Andromeda Galaxy that was part of the Skrull Empire. It was used by the Skrull Emperor to enforce his rule over the Empire as a god-king. The Cube subsequently developed sentience and, because its mind had been imprinted by the megalomaniacal personality of the emperor, it lashed out and devastated a significant portion of the Empire before it reached emotional maturity. It was after this that it started calling itself the "Shaper of Worlds" and chose the form that it uses to this day: an ivory male Skrull torso atop a metallic frustum and tractor treads for apparent mobility.

On an unnamed extradimensional micro-world, the Shaper created a "world" based on the Nazi-dominated 1940s Earth from the mind of ex-Nazi scientist Otto Kronsteig. This "world" was destroyed by the intervention of the Hulk. On Earth, the Shaper then created a "world" based on 1950s American popular culture from the mind of ex-henchman "Slugger" Johnson; this "world" was destroyed by the intervention of the Fantastic Four. The Shaper took Thomas Gideon as his apprentice before leaving Earth. The Shaper returns later, creating a "paradise world" of peace for the Hulk on an unnamed planetoid, based on his fondest dreams from the mind of the Hulk. This is because the Shaper feels guilty for harassing the Hulk earlier. The Shaper creates illusions of the Hulk's long-lost love interest, Jarella; and deceased friend, Crackajack Johnson. The peace is marred by the appearance of the Toad Men, who have invaded looking for slaves. In the next issue, the Toad Men kill the Shaper's friend, Glorian. This causes the illusion to fall apart, which sends the Hulk on a rampage. The Toad Men are defeated and the Hulk rejects the Shaper's offer for a new illusionary reality, which destroyed the "paradise world".

Glorian was later revealed to be the transformed Thomas Gideon, and was not actually killed on the paradise world. The Shaper witnessed Glorian's attempt to create a "world" based on the dreams of the inhabitants from a small town ruined by the accidental intervention of the Hulk. The Shaper was sent by the Kree Supreme Intelligence to guide the evolution of Earth's Cosmic Cube into a sentient being; while there, the Shaper encountered Captain America and the Aquarian and revealed to them his origin as the Cosmic Cube created long ago by the Skrulls.

With Kubik (formerly the Earth's Cosmic Cube), the Shaper encountered the Fantastic Four and Doctor Doom in the universe of the Beyonder. The Shaper recounted the Beyonder's true origin as part of the same force that created the Molecule Man, and witnessed the transformation of the Beyonder and the Molecule Man into a new Cosmic Cube. The Shaper later allowed Glorian to return to Earth to use his power to help the Hulk achieve nobility. The outing ultimately went badly for Glorian, and the Shaper rescued the Hulk and Glorian from the demonic attention of Satannish (in the guise of Cloot).

During the "Last Days" part of the Secret Wars storyline, Glorian tells the Silver Surfer and Dawn how the Shaper of Worlds will help him rebuild the universe for the heroes to return to after they finish up in Battleworld. It is revealed that the white area that Glorian and his assistant Zee are in is the small spot that is between his eye and his nose.

Powers and abilities
The Shaper of Worlds is an alien matter-energy construct with unknown, and potentially incalculable physical power. He has the ability to restructure finite pockets of reality and to alter the molecular configuration of persons and objects. He is also capable of intergalactic and interdimensional teleportation, and empathic perception. The Shaper's intelligence is immeasurable, but lacking a creative imagination, the Shaper must use the mind of another sentient being as a template for his transformations of worlds.

The Shaper has massive power, but he cannot actually create new worlds; after destroying a significant portion of the Skrull Empire, he deliberately limited the scope of his powers. He only rearranges the structure of an existing world to fit the template that has been requested by another. The alien can only create worlds if it has the dreams of another living being to use as a blueprint. These factors are often considered to be the greatest drawbacks to its powers.

It is his curse that he has a strong desire to make dreams come true, but does not have any dreams himself. He seeks out other beings that he senses have wishes he can fulfill. Only in this way can he find a release for his strong desire to shape reality.

Glorian and Kubik are his protégés.

The Shaper of Worlds has fought the Hulk, and the Fantastic Four. It was he who taught the Beyonder and the Molecule Man that they shared a common origin and merged them into the being known as Kosmos.

Other versions

Batman vs. the Incredible Hulk
In the 1981 DC/Marvel crossover Batman vs. the Incredible Hulk, the Shaper of Worlds, who was stranded on Earth, teamed with the Joker to acquire a gamma-ray gun to treat a disease he had acquired that was driving him mad. The Joker finally succeeds in stealing the gamma-ray gun, but finding its power insufficient. The entity then realizes the Hulk's gamma radiation in him contains the key to his power being restored, leading the Joker to kidnap the Hulk instead. The plan succeeds, with the Shaper subsequently making the Joker's dreams real, but Batman and the Hulk team up to defeat the duo.

References

External links
 Shaper of Worlds at Marvel.com
 

Characters created by Archie Goodwin (comics)
Characters created by Herb Trimpe
Comics characters introduced in 1972
Marvel Comics Cosmic Cubes